Farhad Tavakoli Rouzbahani (born 14 January 1989) is an Iranian professional futsal player. He is currently a member of Giti Pasand in the Iranian Futsal Super League.

Honours

Country 
 FIFA Futsal World Cup
 Third place (1): 2016
 AFC Futsal Championship
 Champion (2): 2016–2018
 Runners-up (1): 2014
 Asian Indoor and Martial Arts Games
 Champion (2): 2013–2017
 Grand Prix
 Runner-Up (1): 2015

Club 
 AFC Futsal Club Championship
 Runner-Up (1): 2016 (Naft Al Wasat)
 Iraq Futsal League
 Champion (3): 2015–16 (Naft Al Wasat), 2016–17 (Naft Al Wasat), 2017–18 (Naft Al Wasat)

Individual 
 Best player:
 * MVP – AFC Futsal Club Championship: 2016

References

External links 
 

1989 births
Living people
People from Ahvaz
Futsal defenders
Futsal forwards
Iranian men's futsal players
Melli Haffari FSC players
Farsh Ara FSC players
Giti Pasand FSC players
Iranian expatriate futsal players
Iranian expatriate sportspeople in Iraq
Iranian expatriate sportspeople in China
Iranian expatriate sportspeople in Kuwait
Sportspeople from Khuzestan province
21st-century Iranian people